The United States men's national floorball team is the men's national floorball team of the United States, and a member of the International Floorball Federation (IFF). The American men's team is currently ranked 16th in the world at floorball following their result at the 2018 Men's World Floorball Championships.

The United States National Team is organized by USA Floorball.

Roster 
As of November 5, 2021

Team Staff 
Head Coach - Joel Olofsson 

General Manager - Adam Troy 

Assistant Coach - Vidar Jonsson Wallin 

Team Manager - Ari Huttunen 

Team Official - David Brown 

Physiotherapist - Julia Olofsson

References 

Floorball
Men's national sports teams of the United States